LECO may refer to:

A Coruña Airport, OACI airport code
LECO Corporation